Shannon is an unincorporated community on Farm to Market Road 175 20 miles southwest of Henrietta in far south central Clay County, Texas, United States, approximately 1/2 mile north of the Jack County line.

History
It was established in 1878 and was first known as Stampede Springs. The name was quickly changed to Shannon in honor of a pioneer family from the Shannon Valley in Ireland. A post office opened in 1893.  By 1910 the local school enrolled 28 students and had two teachers. By 1920, its population was reported as 112. Its population remained around 100 until 1970 when only 80 residents were reported.  By 1980 the population reached its current level. There are currently no business, schools or post office in Shannon.

Education
Shannon is served by the Midway Independent School District.

External links
 

Unincorporated communities in Texas
Unincorporated communities in Clay County, Texas
Wichita Falls metropolitan area
Ghost towns in North Texas